Stjørdalen is a valley and a traditional district in Trøndelag county, Norway.  The valley follows the river Stjørdalselva river from the border with Sweden  to the west where it empties into the Trondheimsfjorden. The valley traverses the present-day municipalities of Stjørdal and Meråker.  The European route E14 highway and the Meråker Line railway follow the river through the length of the valley.

The traditional district of Stjørdalen is a historical region surrounding the Stjørdalen valley.  The area is sometimes considered the southern part of the Inntrøndelag region.  The neighboring communities of Selbu and Tydal to the south are sometimes grouped together in this historic district.  From the Iron Age through the Middle Ages, the area was referred to as Stiordølafylki, one of the small petty kingdoms in the Trøndelag region under the Frostating assembly.

History
Stjørdalen was once a municipality of its own.  It was established on 1 January 1838 (see formannskapsdistrikt), but in 1850 it was split to create the two new municipalities of Øvre Stjørdal and Nedre Stjørdal. Later, in 1874, Øvre Stjørdal was split into Hegra and Meråker municipalities. On 1 January 1901, Nedre Stjørdal was split into three municipalities of nearly equal sizes: Skatval, Stjørdal, and Lånke.  At this point, there were now five municipalities in the valley.  During the 1960s, there were many municipal mergers across Norway due to the work of the Schei Committee.  On 1 January 1962, Hegra, Skatval, Stjørdal, and Lånke were merged to form the new Stjørdal municipality. On 1 June 1997, the village of Stjørdalshalsen in Stjørdal municipality gained status as a city. Currently, the combined population of the municipalities of Stjørdal and Meråker is 21,738.

References

Districts of Trøndelag
Stjørdal
Meråker
Valleys of Trøndelag